Congestion may refer to:

Medicine 
Excessive fluid in tissues, vessels, or both, including: 
 Edema, abnormal accumulation of fluid in the interstitium, manifesting as swelling
 Peripheral edema, edema in peripheral body parts such as limbs and feet
 Pulmonary edema, edema in the lungs that impairs breathing
 Congestive heart failure, heart failure resulting in congestion in one or more organs
 Nasal congestion, the blockage of nasal passages due to swollen membranes
 Prostatic congestion, a medical condition that happens when the prostate becomes swollen by excess fluid

Other uses
 Network congestion, reduced quality of service when a network is carrying more data than it can handle
 Traffic congestion, vehicles clogging streets and highways
 Congestion pricing, a system of surcharging users of public goods that are subject to congestion through excess demand
 Congestion (film), a 1918 silent film